Murray Smith is a former New Zealand politician. He was a member of the United Future New Zealand party caucus, having been elected to Parliament as a list MP in the 2002 election.

Political career

Before entering national politics, Smith was a lawyer.

He was a founding member of the Christian Democrats, which later became Future New Zealand. Future New Zealand then joined with United New Zealand to form the modern United Future New Zealand.

Like his associates, Larry Baldock, Bernie Ogilvy, Paul Adams and Marc Alexander, Smith only served one term before he left Parliament at the 2005 New Zealand general election, given that his party polled only one-third of its previous electoral support.

In the 2008 election, Smith stood for United Future in the electorate of Hutt South.

References

External links
 UFNZ's party's website

United Future MPs
20th-century New Zealand lawyers
Christian Democrat Party (New Zealand) politicians
New Zealand list MPs
Living people
Year of birth missing (living people)
Unsuccessful candidates in the 1996 New Zealand general election
Unsuccessful candidates in the 1999 New Zealand general election
Unsuccessful candidates in the 2005 New Zealand general election
Unsuccessful candidates in the 2008 New Zealand general election
Members of the New Zealand House of Representatives
21st-century New Zealand politicians